Apollon Smyrnis Football Club, or in its full name Gymnasticos Syllogos Apollon Smyrnis (Gymnastics Club Apollon of Smyrna) is a professional football club based in Rizoupoli in the city of Athens, Greece. It participates in the Greek Super League 2.
It was founded in Smyrna, Ottoman Empire, by Anatolian Greeks in 1891 and is one of the oldest Hellenic sports clubs. Following the compulsory population exchange between Greece and Turkey the club was re-established in Athens Greece in 1923 and is also known as Apollon Athens. 

Apollon Smyrnis has also departments basketball, volleyball, water polo and other sports.

History

Smyrna era (1891–1922)

Apollon Smyrnis was founded in 1891 by former members of club Orpheus. Orpheus (subsequently Panionios) had been founded one year earlier in 1890. Among the founders of Apollon were prominent residents of Smyrna such as Chrysostomos of Smyrna and Vasilis Samios.

Roughly in the year 1893, the athletic department was organised. The first games of Smyrna took place in 1894, organized by the English sports fans of Bornova, a district in İzmir nowadays. In these games the athletes of Apollon achieved a lot of first victories. The person with the most wins was Theologos Anastasoglou, a glorious athlete who later became Olympic champion; he was most likely the best athlete from Apollon. The Games were always organized by English sports fans until 1903, with the attendance of the Gymnastic Association Apollon Smyrnis.

The third anniversary of the foundation of Apollon was celebrated joyously. Chairman N. Koulmasis gave the speech of the day, while the famous S. Pittakis spoke of Delphi and recited the anthem to the god Apollo. There was a special pedestal on which had been set up an altar to praise the god Apollo, while eight youths dressed in chlamydes sang the Pindariko anthem to Apollo.

In 1894, with the election of its new presiding board, Apollon adopted as its emblem three runners and at the same time it established an excursion department. Of the first excursions that were organized, one was to Ephesus and another to Aydın, in which the Russian scholar and historical Frigkol took part.

In 1894, the council of the Gymnastic Association of Apollon (Apollon Sports Club) was composed of chairman Mathaios Provatopoulos and Th. Vatidi, Jakovos Koulampidis, Grig. Sofianopoulos, G. Oikonomidis, A. Koulampidis and C. Papadimitriou. During this season the team acquired a privately owned ground. Initially, only its members fought on these. Later, however, it organized games in which other associations could also take part.

Apollon Smyrna's stadium
Apollon acquired its own stadium in 1894. At this point we should examine a little the background of the foundation of the first ground of Apollon. Fourteen years before, in 1880, Ioannis Damvergis with Apostolos Psaltof, Stefanos Papamihalis and I. Makroulidis, all students of the Evangelic Faculty of Smyrna, created an off-hand gym in some open space, known with the name "love arena". After they opened the ground, they set up a perimeter using ropes because of a lack of money. Then, with hard economising, they bought a horizontal bar and other gymnastic equipment. The youth of Smyrna exercised there paying a symbolic price. Makroulidis was made cashier. This primitive gym constituted the precursor of the gym of Apollo, but was also the fountain for the later great athletes of the association. For this reason, the creator of this gym, Apostolos Psaltof, was called the "grandfather'" of Apollon.
Later the gymnastic association "Apollon Smyrnis" moved to a space opposite the Greek Orphanage where was then built a big and modern gym in the district of Saint Tryfon, near the famous theatre "Terpsithea".

In 1901 Apollon organized the first boat races in Smyrna, with the attendance of the other big Smyrna association, "Panionios", which was founded in 1898 and came forth from the union of associations "Orpheus" and "Gymnasium".

Apollonian Games
On 6 and 8 May 1904, the Apollon Stadium of Bornova organised the first Apollonian Games with the attendance, not only of the organizers, the "Gymnastic Association Apollo Smyrnis" and the "Athletic Organization of Bornova", but also the "Athletic Union of Smyrni" as well. Remarkably, the making of these games was all under the supervision of prefect of Smyrni, Kiamil pasa, a measure of the huge scope and power of this association. The committee of the athletic games consisted of: Sokratis Solomonidis, Xristos Athanasoulas, Xenophon Dimas, Kostas Kotzias, Petros Mposkovik, A. Vanterze and Richard Whittes. The committee of ellanodikes was composed of Nikos Stavridis (chairman of Apollon), E. Fintao and D. Whittes. The opening ceremony for the first Apollonian Games started with a parade of all athletes under the sounds of music that was played by the orchestra of Apollon with director I. Magglis. The gymnastic association "Apollon Smyrnis" took part with 54 athletes. The biggest attraction was the 10 km run, won by L. Venizelos with a time of 34'43. Another popular game attraction was the sakodromies (small jumps), a race of 60 m, in which the runners were fully surrounded with cloth sacks up to their necks. Afterwards, at the end of the games, there was the handing-over of prizes and the athletes, followed by thousands of spectators and escorted by the orchestra of Apollo, walked to the railway station of Bornova, from where they took off to Smyrni by special train. From the railway station of Mpasmahane to the offices of the Apollon Gymnastic Association in the Bella Vista, a lampadidodromia (running with torches) took place. The "Apollonia" aka Apollonian Games were held in Smyrna, with exceptional success, ten times in total. In these games took part almost all athletic associations of Smyrna, Greek and foreign, except the Turkish clubs.

Rivalry between Apollon and Panionios
This period is also the beginning of the great rivalry between Apollon and Panionios, which has continued until modern times, although without any extremes. The point of contention was the claim of supremacy in the capital of Ionia. However, this antagonism was progressively blunted, since the men of Apollon were active mainly in football and went on to create one of the most powerful teams of Asia Minor and one of the three most important teams in Greek lands, whereas Panionios was focused on the track, producing some very important athletes.
In 1904, Apollon took part in the Pan-Hellenic athletics that were organized in Athens. The city of Smyrna was represented by athletes from Panionios and Apollon. The athletes of the Gymnastic Association Apollon Smyrnis gained a lot of victories: Theologos Anastasoglou, Mathaios Despotopoulos, Kiros Alexiou, Dimitrios Mouratis and X. Lohner. Athenian man of letters, I. Damvergis, who represented Apollon in Athens, announced the news of the victories to Smyrna via telegraph. The chairman of Apollon answered: "We are grateful to you, give our congratulations to the champions." On May 1, 1905, the Apollon club celebrated with magnificence. With the music orchestra of Apollon at its head, the association organised a parade of all of the club athletes in the major streets of Smyrna. In 1906, common games were organized in Smyrna for the athletes of Apollon and Panionios. In these games victors for Apollon were the following athletes: Gounaris, Patestidis and K. Alexiou. In the same season, the Gymnastic Association Apollon Smyrnis suggested replacing the Apollonian and the Panionian Games of Smyrni with Pan Minor-Asian games. This effort, however, was not realised due to strong opposition from Panionios. In the same year (1906) Apollon took part in the Olympic Games of Athens (Middle Olympics). Its athletes Theologos Anastasoglou and Mathaios Despotopoulos were winners in pentathlon, writing yet another brilliant page in the history of the club.

The football team
1910 was a very important year in the history of Apollon. During this year the football team of the club was founded, with swastika as its emblem – a cross which is an ancient Greek symbol. Apollon fans loved this sport in particular, giving it the first place in their hearts. To this contributed, of course, the club's soccer players with their fighting spirit and their high morals. The club competed in football matches with all the teams of Smyrna, as well as with teams of sailors on foreign navy ships that were harboured in the Ionian capital. In 1911, Apollon accomplished a victory over the most powerful soccer team of the season, the team of the Austrian warship "Wirintous"! It is notable that the Austrian admiral sent a congratulations telegram to the presiding board of Apollon. Important also is the victory achieved in 1918 against the almighty team of English warship "Minitor 19", the first warship that had sailed into the harbour of Smyrna, after the defeat of Turkey in the First World War. Successes began to come one after the other and before long Apollon became the leading football association of Ionia. Characteristically, it won the Championship of football games held in Smyrna continuously on the years between 1917 and 1922.

In the Olympic Games of Antwerp (1920) the footballers of Apollon, A. Gkillis, D. Gottis, I. Zaloumis and Fotiadis, took part in the Greece national football team. The final accomplishment of Apollon in Smyrna was in 1922 when it gained the title of champion. Thousands of Apollon fans celebrated this huge success, that was to be the last before the destruction of Smyrna. In the football team of Apollon that year were: Kajsaris, Koygjoyntogloy, Tsarls, Taloymis, Mayromma'tis (Haralampakis), Hrysoylis, Kampoyropoylos, Samjos, Papagjannis, Gottis, Gkjlis, Alevizakis, Domeniko, Viglatsis, Zaloumis, Kimitsopoulos, Magoulas, Marselos and the goalkeepers Fotiadis (main) and Zeimpekis (substitute). Two of them, Marselos and Hrysoulis, were captured and remained forever on Ionian soil. Also, in Smyrna remained as captives, A. and G. Kyrou, members of the council of Apollon, as well as champion of track Kr. Persis, the traces of whom were lost from then on. The council of Gymnastic Association Apollon Smyrnis, on the last year at Smyrna was composed of: D. Marselos (chairman), J. Garyfalos (general secretary), A. Kyrou (special secretary), and Hatzithomas (cashier).

Apollon in Athens (1922–)
After the Greco-Turkish War and the expulsion of the Greeks from Asia Minor, Apollon moved to Athens. The club's first home ground was located at a place near the Greek Parliament called "Stiles Olympiou Dios" (Pillars of Olympian Zeus). Apollon stayed there for about 25 years, and after World War II the club's house was again transferred to an Athens neighbourhood called "Rizoupoli" and a stadium was built there, Georgios Kamaras Stadium, named after club legend Georgios Kamaras.
The club has four departments: the football department called "Apollon Smyrnis FC", a basketball club called "Apollon BC", a volleyball club and a fighting department. The best known (and probably the most successful) department is the football club. Apollon FC participated in the Alpha Ethniki championship for many years, with the exception of seasons 1969–70, 1972–73, 1974–75, 1986–87. The team won the local Athens Championship five times, on 1924, 1928, 1938, 1948 and 1958.

Seasons 1994–95 and 1995–96 are the club's most successful seasons:
In 1994–95, Apollon qualified for the 1995–96 UEFA Cup (preliminary round) where they played against Olimpija Ljubljana. Georgios Kamaras Stadium was not suitable for the game, so Apollon played in AEK Athens' home ground, Nikos Goumas Stadium. Apollon won 1–0 in Athens in front of 10,000 fans but lost 3–1 in Ljubljana and was eliminated (Olimpia scored 2 goals in the last 15 minutes). In those matches, many people noticed a young striker (just 21 years old at the time) who would become European football Champion almost ten years after; his name was Demis Nikolaidis.
The following season, 1995–96, Apollon under the coaching of Giannis Pathiakakis and thanks to Demis Nikolaidis' capital scoring performances, reached the Greek Cup final after an excellent season, where they lost 7–1 to AEK Athens. In the same season, Apollon made one of the biggest victories in his history, defeating Olympiacos at Georgios Karaiskakis Stadium with 0–3, with an amazing goal of Demis Nikolaidis. After these great seasons, Apollon's glory started to fade and as a result, in the 1999–00 season Apollon was relegated to Beta Ethniki. Then, in 2005 it was relegated to Gamma Ethniki (South Group) and finally, in 2007, to Delta Ethniki (Group 8).

Apollon have gone since the 1930s under the nickname "The Light Brigade" (Greek: Ελαφρά Ταξιαρχία), named after the 1936 Hollywood movie The Charge of the Light Brigade, after winning the 1938 regional Athens championship.

Alamanos era (1979–2005)
In 1979, with the Greek football turning professional, Kostas Alamanos became the major shareholder and president of the team and remained so until 2005. He helped Apollon reach the UEFA Cup preliminary round in 1995 and the Greek Cup final in 1996, but after the departure of many of the team's best footballers, Apollon were unable to recover and in 2000 they were relegated.

Today
Apollon managed to return to the First Division in the 2012–13 season, with Stamatis Vellis, a business shipping magnate, as the new owner. On November 11, 2013, Apollon Smyrnis announced the signing of Northern Irish Lawrie Sanchez as head coach and as assistant coach Stephen Constantine. Their presence contributed to a significant harvesting of points in the second round of the championship, but it was not enough to keep Apollon in the Super League as it finished the penultimate and relegated. In 2014, Vellis resigned from the presidency of Apollon. He testified to the district attorney that the fate of the team depended on the actions of corrupt members of the Hellenic Football Federation, naming a number of officials currently accused in the 2015 Greek football scandal.

From 2015, Apollon Smyrnis is making a new effort with the Monemvasiotis family at the rudder. On 4 June 2017, Apollon Smyrnis were promoted to Super League alongside 2nd placed Lamia.

Stadium

In 1880, Ioannis Dammergis, along with Apostolos Psaltoff, Stefanos Papamichalis and I. Makroulidis, created a snapshot in an open space, known as the "love of talani". In this stadium, young people from all over Smyrna were hired paying a penny. Makroulidis was appointed a treasurer. This primitive gym (fenced with a cloth rope) was the precursor of Apollon's gymnasium, as well as the hive for the later great athletes of the club. That's why the creator of this gymnasium, I. Psalof, called him "grandfather" of Apollon. Later, Apollon Smyrnis gymnasium moved to a place in front of the Greek Orphanage and then built a large and modern gym in the area of Tryfonas, near the famous theater "Terpsithea". In 1904, Apollon Smyrnis took over the organization of the Bornova Sports Games. For sports needs, Apollon renovates the Bornova stadium under the architect B. Liti and acquires a 400-meter track and capacity for 6,000 spectators.

With the destruction of Smyrna, Apollon Smyrnis was uprooted and came to Athens. The first station of his Odyssey, the Columns of Olympian Zeus. In an existing stadium, the team first moved into the new home. There they were first seat. There they took the first EPSA champion. But it remained only until 1924.

The second station is Rouf. The seat of the team is transferred and stays there until 1946. The current municipal stadium testifies about the location of the then facilities. Though then the stadium was adjacent to the church of St. Vasilios, which stands out in the background of photography. At this headquarters they once again took an EPSA champion.

In 1946 the club's installations were expropriated by the Railway Company and Apollon moved to Rizoupoli, next to Columbia's facilities.
The stadium is inaugurated on October 17, 1948. Initially, the stadium of the current officials was built. In 1962 the opposite stand with the gates 8,9 and 10 was "found". And in 1971–72, the horseshoe of the stadium was constructed. Today, the capacity of the Rizoupoli Stadium is 14,200 seated spectators. And it now bears the name "Georgios Kamaras Stadium" in memory of one of the top footballers that the club has made.

Trivia

Apollon have gone since the 1930s under the nickname "The Light Brigade" (Greek: Ελαφρά Ταξιαρχία), named after the 1938 Hollywood movie The Charge of the Light Brigade, after winning the 1938 regional Athens championship.
Since 1910 the team's badge was a swastika-like cross. But after the Nazi invasion of Europe it was changed to Apollo's head for obvious reasons.
The last time an Apollon FC player was an active member of the Greece national football team was on May 8, 1996 (Demis Nikolaidis, Greece–Georgia 2–1). Since then, no Apollon FC player has been a member of the national team.
Georgios Kamaras Stadium was in bad shape during the 1990s, but it was renovated in 2002 by Olympiacos FC. Olympiacos used this stadium as their home ground until Georgios Karaiskakis Stadium was constructed in 2004.
Kostas Alamanos was shareholder and team president from the late 1970s until 2005. He helped Apollon reach the UEFA Cup preliminary round and the Greek Cup final and for many years, was beloved by Apollon fans. But after these successful seasons, Alamanos became persona non grata for the fans, mainly because he sold many of the team's best footballers (Demis Nikolaidis, Blendar Kola and Theofilos Karasavvidis) and released most of the remaining team as free agents. The team was unable to recover from these losses, and in 2000 were relegated. That's why Apollon fans are calling Alamanos "The Unmentionable".
Still today Apollon is the 9th team with respect to number of appearances in the top league of Greece (37/53).

Crest and colours
The first emblem of the club, since 1894, was the three runners.
In 1910, the football club's emblem becomes the ancient Greek conveyor, which will be removed even before World War II, given its already negative identification with National Socialism and Adolf Hitler.
In the first post-war years, club jerseys simply write GSA (Gymnastics Association of Apollon).
Later, the club's emblem is adopted with the bust of the god Apollo. The current crest depicts the head of Apollo Citharoedus (or Musagetes). The colours of the club are cyan (light blue) and white.

First

Current sponsorships:
Official Sponsor: Venetis Bakery
Official Sport Clothing Manufacturer: Hummel

Honours
Super League
Runners-up (2): 1938, 1948
Greek Cup
Runners-up (1): 1996
 Athens FCA Championship
Winners (4): 1924, 1938, 1948, 1958
 Football League
Winners (5): 1970, 1973, 1975, 2013, 2017
 Gamma Ethniki
Winners (1): 2012
 Fourth Division
Winners (1): 2010

Players

Current squad

Notable former players

Albania
 Arjan Bellaj
 Julian Gjeloshi
 Edmond Dalipi
 Indrit Fortuzi
 Ilir Shulku
 Ylli Shehu
 Giannis Thomas
 Bledar Kola
 Alban Bushi
 Altin Ndrita
 Simo Rrumbullaku
 Kristo Minga
 Mario Selmanaj
 Fatjon Andoni
 Aldjon Pashaj
 Alexandros Kouros
 Leonidas Rossi
 Klodian Gino
 Dejvid Janaqi
Angola
 Francisco Zuela
Argentina
 Nestor Errea
 Leandro Álvarez
 Adrián Lucero
 Sebastián Bartolini
 Sebastián Setti
 Juan Larrea
 Diego Romano
 Gastón González
 Lucas Nanía
 Joel Acosta
 Matías Defederico
 Matías Orihuela
 Axel Juárez
 Gonzalo Castillejos
 Luis Salces
 Germán Rivero
 Javier Iritier
 Israel Coll
 Nico Martínez
 Braian Lluy
 Maximiliano Cuadra
 Matías Odone
 Germán Herrera
Armenia
 André Calisir
Australia
 Tzimis Alexiou
 Giorgos Chaniotis
 Christos Tomaras
Austria
 Dietmar Berchtold
Belarus
 Mikalay Signevich
Belgium
 Vassilis Mytilinaios
 Ritchie Kitoko
 Davino Verhulst
 Japhet Muanza
Bosnia-Herzegovina
 Davorin Juričić
 Velibor Pudar
 Dragan Glogovac
 Bernard Barnjak
 Predrag Erak
Brazil
 Joassis
 Rodrigo
 Willie
 Felipe Gomes
 Hegon
 Enrico
 Paolo Farinola
 Dennis Souza
 Marcos Bambam
 Wanderson
 Alípio
 Huanderson
 Domingues
 Thomás Bedinelli
 Lucas Mazetti
Bulgaria
 Martin Goranov
 Tihomir Todorov
 Georgi Georgiev
 Ivan Rusev
Burkina Faso
 Abdul Diallo
Cameroon
 Nicolas Dikoumé
 Guy Bwelle
 Michel Pensée
Colombia
 Fabry Castro
Croatia
 Mario Bonić
 Stojan Belajić
 Andrej Lukić
 Karlo Bručić
 Ivan Čović
Czech Republic
 Frantisek Stambacher
 Jan Blažek
Cyprus
 Lefteris Kouis
 Giorgos Papageorgiou
DR Congo
 Jonathan Bijimine
Egypt
 Shikabala
England
 Darren Ambrose
 Lee Cook
France
 Joël Thomas
 Jonathan Parpeix
 Lynel Kitambala
 Kevin Tapoko
 Anthony Mounier
 Michaël Pereira
Finland
  Alexandros Souflas
Germany
 Walter Kelsch
 Kofi Schulz
 Kevin Pezzoni
 Christos Agrodimos
 Nikolaos Ioannidis
 Panagiotis Triadis
 Justin Eilers
Ghana
 Raman Chibsah
 Sadat Karim

Greece
 Christos Albanis
 Alexandros Anagnostopoulos
 Ilias Anastasakos
 Nikos Anastasopoulos
 Kostas Antoniou
 Leonidas Argyropoulos
 Alexandros Arnarellis
 Lefteris Astras
 Giorgos Athanasiadis
 Giannis Bastianos
 Kostas Batsinilas
 Giorgos Barkoglou
 Dimos Baxevanidis
 Kostas Chalkias
 Konstantinos Chatzis
 Giorgos Chatzizisis
 Stratos Chintzidis
 Diamantis Chouchoumis
 Filipos Darlas
 Georgios Dasios
 Giorgos Delizisis
 Antonis Dentakis
 Dimitris Diamantis
 Dimitris Diamantopoulos
 Giannis Dontas
 Giannoulis Fakinos
 Iraklis Garoufalias
 Nikos Giannakopoulos
 Giannis Gianniotas
 Vasilis Golias
 Vangelis Gotovos
 Giorgos Goumagias
 Christos Gromitsaris
 Konstantinos Iasonidis
 Takis Ikonomopoulos
 Andreas Iraklis
 Giorgos Kamaras
 Giorgos Karagounis
 Thanasis Karagounis
 Dimitris Kalogerakos
 Aristidis Kamaras
 Giorgos Kamaras
 Theofilos Karasavvidis
 Stathis Karamalikis
 Nikos Karoulias
 Charis Karpozilos
 Paschalis Kassos
 Giannis Katsikis
 Dimos Kavouras
 Kostas Kiassos
 Vasilios Kinalis
 Thanasis Kolitsidakis
 Pantelis Konstantinidis
 Giannis Kontoes
 Dimitris Kottaras
 Konstantinos Kotsaris
 Michalis Koronis
 Nikos Korovesis
 Michalis Kyrgias
 Tasos Kyriakos
 Vasilis Kyriakou
 Ilias Kyritsis
 Panagiotis Lagos
 Tasos Lagos
 Sotiris Leontiou
 Christos Lisgaras
 Michalis Manias
 Christos Mavridis
 Kostas Mavridis
 Lampros Moustakas
 Antonis Minou
 Tasos Mitropoulos
 Thomas Nazlidis
 Demis Nikolaidis
 Sotiris Ninis
 Giorgos Pamlidis
 Xenofon Panos
 Grigoris Papazacharias
 Tasos Papazoglou
 Thanasis Panteliadis
 Anastasios Pastos
 Manolis Patralis
 Antonis Petropoulos
 Eleftherios Poupakis
 Stergios Psianos
 Vasilis Rovas
 Antonis Rigopoulos
 Achilleas Sarakatsanos
 Savvas Siatravanis
 Giannis Siderakis
 Dimitris Sounas
 Angelos Stamatopoulos
 Savvas Tsabouris
 Konstantinos Tsamouris
 Alexandros Tseberidis
 Timotheos Tselepidis
 Sotiris Tsiloulis
 Ilias Tsiligiris
 Antonis Tsiaras
 Sokratis Tsoukalas
 Stavros Tsoukalas
 Adam Tzanetopoulos
 Christos Tzioras
 Alexandros Tzorvas
 Nikos Vafeas
 Giorgos Valerianos
 Giannis Varkas
 Lefteris Velentzas
 Vasilis Vitlis
 Michalis Vlachos
 Michalis Zaropoulos
Hungary
 András Béres
 Imre Katzenbach
Iran
 Alireza Mansourian
Ireland
 Anthony Stokes
Israel
 Christos Ardizoglou
 Eli Elbaz
Italy
 Christian D'Urso
Ivory Coast
 Franck Manga Guela
 Emmanuel Koné
 Patrick Vouho
Kazakhstan
 Leonidas Kyvelidis
Kenya
 Erick Oduol
Kosovo
 Besar Halimi
Lebanon
 Hilal El-Helwe
Liberia
 Lawrence Doe

Lithuania
 Vykintas Slivka
Malta
 Sunday Eboh
Montenegro 
 Denis Tonkovic
Morocco
 Adil Rhaili
Netherlands
 René van de Kerkhof
 Nassir Maachi
 Darren Maatsen
 Jordy Tutuarima
 Rajiv van La Parra
North Macedonia
 Nikola Jakimovski
Norway
 Arne Dokken
 Thomas Rogne
Nicaragua
 Armando Goufas
Nigeria
 Jerry Ugen
 Ativie Guy Ijiebor Ativie
 Dominic Okanu
 Christian Obodo
 Abiola Dauda
 Jerry Mbakogu
Poland
 Zygmunt Kukla
 Józef Wandzik
 Waldemar Adamczyk
 Artur Blazejewski
 Marcin Kubsik
 Bartłomiej Babiarz
Portugal 
 Bruno Pinheiro
 Hugo Faria
 João Pedro
 Bruno Alves
 Manuel Fernandes
Romania
 Florentin Matei
Senegal
 Henri Camara
Serbia
 Rajko Banjac
 Goran Bošković
 Milan Majstorović
 Zoran Ćirić
 Miloje Petković
 Nenad Nikolić
 Dejan Đurđević
 Zoran Jevtović
 Dragan Stevanović
 Milenko Kovačević
 Vladan Milojević
 Jovica Damjanović
 Nebojsa Jemović
 Radovan Marković
 Milorad Rajović
 Danko Filipović
 Lazar Arsić
 Vaso Vasić
 Marko Blažić
Sierra Leone
 John Kamara
 Kevin Wright
Slovakia 
 Vojtech Kiss
Slovenia
 Grega Sorčan
Spain
 Añete
 Igor Angulo
 David López Nadales
 Didac Devesa
 Boris Garrós
  Marc Fernández
Sweden
 Björn Enqvist
 Goran Trpevski
 Axel Schylström
 Mikael Dahlberg
 Tom Söderberg
Switzerland
 Gabriel Lüchinger
Togo
 Paul Adado
Tunisia
 Wajdi Sahli
Ukraine
 Mykhaylo Mykhaylov
 Ruslan Fomin
Uruguay
 Miguel Falero
 Gonzalo González
USA
 Frank Klopas

Managers

 Manol Manolov (July 1, 1979 – June 30, 1980)
 Tomislav Kaloperović (July 1, 1988 – June 30, 1989)
 Gerhard Prokop (July 1, 1989 – June 30, 1990)
 Walter Skocik (July 1, 1990 – June 30, 1991)
 Christos Archontidis (July 1, 1998 – Sept 3, 1999)
 Stathis Stathopoulos (July 1, 2011 – March 20, 2012)
 Giannis Georgaras (March 19, 2012 – June 30, 2012)
 Bledar Kola (July 21, 2012 – Aug 7, 2012)
 Alexandros Vosniadis (Aug 7, 2012 – Oct 8, 2013)
 Babis Tennes (Oct 10, 2013 – Nov 11, 2013)
 Lawrie Sanchez (Nov 17, 2013 – June 16, 2014)
 Nikos Kostenoglou (July 1, 2014 – December 8, 2014)
 Alexandros Vosniadis (December 12, 2014 – November 2, 2015)
 Babis Tennes (Nov 3, 2015 – March 29, 2016)
 Konstantinos Panagopoulos (Apr 2, 2016 – Apr 18, 2016)
 Georgios Vazakas (Apr 18, 2016 – Jun 6, 2016)
 Dimitrios Spanos (Jun 9, 2016 – Dec 24, 2016)
 Apostolos Mantzios (Dec 29, 2016 – June 20, 2018)
 Valérien Ismaël (June 22, 2018 – August 27, 2018)
 Alberto Monteagudo (August 31, 2018 – October 3, 2018)
 Giannis Matzourakis (October 3, 2018 – November 26, 2018)
 Babis Tennes (November 27, 2018 – March 9, 2019)
 Lefteris Velentzas (March 9, 2019 – May 23, 2019)
 Nikolaos Papadopoulos (July 1, 2019 – January 8, 2020)
 Babis Tennes (January 8, 2020 – September 2, 2020)
 Georgios Paraschos (September 10, 2020 – March 16, 2021)
 Makis Chavos (March 17, 2021 – May 28, 2021)
 Giannis Petrakis (June 1, 2021 – September 22, 2021)

Club personnel

Management

|}

League statistics

Positioning in Greek league

European matches

See also
 GS Apollon Smyrnis

References

External links

Official websites
Official website 
Apollon Smyrnis at the Super League 
Apollon Smyrnis at the UEFA
News sites
Apollon Smyrnis on a-sports.gr 
Apollon Smyrnis news from Nova Sports
Other
Apollon Smyrnis Fans website 

 
Association football clubs established in 1891
Football clubs in Athens
Sports teams in İzmir
Ottoman İzmir/Smyrna
Diaspora sports clubs
1891 establishments in the Ottoman Empire